Sog or SOG may refer to:

People
 Andre Ward, US boxer nicknamed S.O.G. (Son Of God)

Places
 Sog, Tibet (also Sogba), Nagqu Prefecture, Tibet Autonomous Region of China
 Sog County, county in Tibet
 Sogchu River, in Sog County, Tibet
 Sog River, river in Iceland
 SOG, Sogndal Airport, Haukåsen (IATA Airport code)

Organizations
 Society of Genealogists, UK
 Special Operations Group (disambiguation), a police and military unit in the UK and many other places

Military
 Special Operations Group (disambiguation), special forces teams
 Särskilda operationsgruppen, a special forces regiment, Sweden
 SOG Knife, used by U.S. armed forces
 SOG Specialty Knives, US manufacturer
 Military Assistance Command, Vietnam – Studies and Observations Group (MACV-SOG or SOG), clandestine US special operations group 1964–1972
 Spear Operations Group, an American private military company responsible for assassinations in the Yemeni Civil War

Science and technology
 Speed over ground, a nautical term
 Stool osmotic gap, a medical test value
 Sync-on-green, a method of sending component video sync signals to video displays